Amparito Roca is the name of a piece of music composed in 1925 by Spanish musician and composer Jaime Teixidor (1884–1957) who named it after one of his piano students, then 12-year-old Amparito Roca (1912–1993).

It was first performed in September 1925 in the theater El Siglo in the town of Carlet where the composer lived at the time. It is a pasodoble and one of the better known pieces of Spanish music around the world.

The score was published in Madrid later in 1925 by Música Moderna, and then in Barcelona by Joaquín Mora in 1928. Boosey & Hawkes published this in 1935 in two arrangements by Aubrey Winter (1870–1955), one for wind band and one for brass band.

A book has been published (written in Spanish) under the auspices of the Ajuntament De Carlet, Valencia, with the title "Amparito Roca, El Pasadoble Del Mestre Texidor". It contains biographical material and commentary on the works of Texidor with a catalogue and discography. The text is by Angel Valero Garcia.

It has been suggested that Amparito Roca (also published as Amparita Roca) was actually composed by British bandmaster Reginald Clifford Ridewood (1907-1942), who composed several pasodobles after being stationed at Gibraltar. "The assumption is that after Ridewood failed to apply for the copyright, Texidor re-scored the paso doble for Spanish bands and then reissued it as Amparito Roca under copyright as his composition." This is patently false. Amparito Roca was first performed in 1925 when Ridewood was only 17, and he was not assigned to Gibraltar until 1930.

References

Spanish music
1925 compositions